is a Japanese football player.

Playing career
Watanabe was born in Ehime Prefecture on August 25, 2000. He joined J2 League club Ehime FC from youth team in 2018. On June 6, he debuted against Mito Hollyhock in Emperor's Cup.

References

External links

2000 births
Living people
Association football people from Ehime Prefecture
Japanese footballers
J2 League players
Ehime FC players
Association football midfielders